The Beach Boys are an American rock group formed in California in 1961.

(The) Beach Boy(s) may also refer to:

Literature
 Beach Boy, a 1997 novel by Ardashir Vakil
 The Beach Boys, a 1985 edition of the 1978 biography The Beach Boys and the California Myth written by David Leaf
 The Beach Boys, a 1979 biography of the band written by Byron Preiss

Music
 The Beach Boys (album), the band's eponymous 1985 album
 The Beach Boys (touring band), the live configuration of the Beach Boys
 "Beach Boy", a 1965 single by Ronny & the Daytonas
 "Beach Boys", a song by Weezer from Pacific Daydream

Television
 Beach Boys (TV series), a 1997 Japanese television drama

See also
 Beach (disambiguation)
 Boys (disambiguation)